Chile competed at the 1988 Summer Olympics in Seoul, South Korea. 17 competitors, 16 men and 1 woman, took part in 14 events in 6 sports.

Medalists

Competitors
The following is the list of number of competitors in the Games.

Athletics

Men's 100 metres
Carlos Moreno
 Heat – 10.70 (→ did not advance)

Men's 200 metres
Carlos Moreno
 Heat – 22.13 (→ did not advance)

Men's 800 metres
Pablo Squella
 Heat – 1:48.99
 Semifinals – 1:46.45 (→ did not advance)

Men's Marathon
Omar Aguilar
 did not finish (→ no ranking)

Men's 3,000m Steeplechase
 Emilio Ulloa
 Heat — did not finish (→ did not advance)

Men's Shot Put
 Gert Weil
 Qualifying Heat – 20.18m
 Final – 20.38m (→ 6th place)

Modern pentathlon

Three male pentathletes represented Chile in 1988.

Men's Individual Competition:
 Julio Fuentes — 4325 pts (→ 55th place)
 Ricardo Falconi — 4316 pts (→ 56th place)
 Gerardo Cortes — 4156 pts, (→ 58th place)

Men's Team Competition:
 Fuentes, Falconi, and Cortes — 12797 pts (→ 18th place)

Rowing

Sailing

Shooting

Table tennis

See also
Chile at the 1987 Pan American Games

References

Nations at the 1988 Summer Olympics
1988
Summer Olympics